Virtual DOS machines (VDM) refer to a technology that allows running 16-bit/32-bit DOS and 16-bit Windows programs when there is already another operating system running and controlling the hardware.

Overview
Virtual DOS machines can operate either exclusively through typical software emulation methods (e.g. dynamic recompilation) or can rely on the virtual 8086 mode of the Intel 80386 processor, which allows real mode 8086 software to run in a controlled environment by catching all operations which involve accessing protected hardware and forwarding them to the normal operating system (as exceptions). The operating system can then perform an emulation and resume the execution of the DOS software.

VDMs generally also implement support for running 16- and 32-bit protected mode software (DOS extenders), which has to conform to the DOS Protected Mode Interface (DPMI).

When a DOS program running inside a VDM needs to access a peripheral, Windows will either allow this directly (rarely), or will present the DOS program with a virtual device driver (VDD) which emulates the hardware using operating system functions. A VDM will systematically have emulations for the Intel 8259A interrupt controllers, the 8254 timer chips, the 8237 DMA controller, etc.

Concurrent DOS 8086 emulation mode
In January 1985 Digital Research together with Intel previewed Concurrent DOS 286 1.0, a version of Concurrent DOS capable of running real mode DOS programs in the 80286's protected mode. The method devised on B-1 stepping processor chips, however, in May 1985 stopped working on the C-1 and subsequent processor steppings shortly before Digital Research was about to release the product. Although with the E-1 stepping Intel started to address the issues in August 1985, so that Digital Research's "8086 emulation mode" worked again utilizing the undocumented LOADALL processor instruction, it was too slow to be practical. Microcode changes for the E-2 stepping improved the speed again. This early implementation can be seen as a predecessor to actual virtual DOS machines.

Eventually, Concurrent DOS 286 was reworked from a potential desktop operating system to become FlexOS 286 for industrial use in 1986. It was also licensed by IBM for their 4680 OS in 1986.

When Intel's 80386 with its virtual 8086 mode became available (as samples since October 1985 and in quantities since June 1986), Digital Research switched to use this to run real mode DOS programs in virtual DOS machines in protected mode under Concurrent DOS 386 1.0 (February 1987) and FlexOS 386 1.0 (June 1987). However, the architecture of these multiuser multitasking 
protected mode operating systems was not DOS-based by themselves.

Concurrent DOS 386 was later developed to become Multiuser DOS (since 1991) and REAL/32 (since 1995). FlexOS 386 later became 4690 OS in 1993.

DOS-based VDMs
In contrast to these protected mode operating systems, DOS, by default, is a real-mode operating system, switching to protected mode and virtual 86 mode only on behalf of memory managers and DOS extenders in order to provide access to extended memory or map in memory into the first megabyte, which is accessible to normal DOS programs.

DOS-based VDMs appeared with Microsoft's Windows/386 2.01 in September 1987. DOS-based virtual DOS machines were also present in Windows 3.0, 3.1x and Windows for Workgroups 3.1x running in 386 Enhanced Mode as well as in Windows 95, 98, 98 SE and ME. One of the characteristics of these solutions running on top of DOS is that the memory layout shown inside virtual DOS machines are virtual instances of the DOS system and DOS driver configuration run before the multitasker is loaded, and that requests which cannot be handled in protected mode are passed down into the system domain to be executed by the underlying DOS system.
  
Similar to Windows 3.x 386 Enhanced Mode in architecture, EMM386 3.xx of Novell DOS 7, Caldera OpenDOS 7.01, DR-DOS 7.02 (and later) also uses DOS-based VDMs to support pre-emptive multitasking of multiple DOS applications, when the EMM386 /MULTI option is used. This component has been under development at Digital Research / Novell since 1991 under the codename "Vladivar" (originally a separate device driver KRNL386.SYS instead of a module of EMM386). While primarily developed for the next major version of DR DOS, released as Novell DOS 7 in 1994, it was also used in the never released DR DOS "Panther" and "Star Trek" project in 1992/1993.

OS/2 MVDM
VDMs called MVDM (Multiple Virtual DOS Machine) are used in OS/2 2.0 and later since 1992. OS/2 MVDMs are considerably more powerful than NTVDM. For example, block devices are supported, and various DOS versions can be booted into an OS/2 MVDM. While the OS/2 1.x DOS box was based on DOS 3.0, OS/2 2.x MVDMs emulate DOS 5.0.

Seamless integration of Windows 3.1 and later Win32s applications in OS/2 is a concept looking similar on surface to the seamless integration of XP Mode based on Windows Virtual PC in Windows 7. A redirector in a "guest" VDM or NTVDM allows access on the disks of the OS/2 or NT "host". Applications in a "guest" can use named pipes for communication with their "host".

Due to a technical limitation, DOS and 16-bit Windows applications under OS/2 were unable to see more than 2 GB of hard drive space, this was fixed in ArcaOS 5.0.4.

Windows NTVDM

NTVDM was a system component of all IA-32 editions of the Windows NT family since 1993 with the release of Windows NT 3.1. It allows execution of 16-bit Windows and 16-bit / 32-bit DOS applications. The Windows NT 32-bit user-mode executable which forms the basis for a single DOS (or Windows 3.x) environment is called .

In order to execute DOS programs, NTVDM loads  which in turn loads , which executes a modified  in order to run the application that was passed to NTVDM as command-line argument. This holds true even in the newest releases of Windows; many additional MS-DOS functions and commands introduced in MS-DOS versions 6.x and in Windows 9x are missing.

16-bit Windows applications by default all run in their own thread within a single NTVDM process. Although NTVDM itself is a 32-bit process and pre-emptively multitasked with respect to the rest of the system, the 16-bit applications within it are cooperatively multitasked with respect to each other. When the "Run in separate memory space" option is checked in the Run box or the application's shortcut file, each 16-bit Windows application gets its own NTVDM process and is therefore pre-emptively multitasked with respect to other processes, including other 16-bit Windows applications. NTVDM emulates BIOS calls and tables as well as the Windows 3.1 kernel and 16-bit API stubs. The 32-bit WoW translation layer thunks 16-bit API routines.

32-bit DOS emulation is present for DOS Protected Mode Interface (DPMI) and 32-bit memory access. This layer converts the necessary extended and expanded memory calls for DOS functions into Windows NT memory calls.  is the emulation layer that emulates 16-bit Windows. Windows 2000 and Windows XP added Sound Blaster 2.0 emulation. 16-bit virtual device drivers and DOS block device drivers (e.g., RAM disks) are not supported. Inter-process communication with other subsystems can take place through OLE, DDE and named pipes.

Since virtual 8086 mode is not available on non-x86-based processors (more specifically, MIPS, DEC Alpha, and PowerPC) NTVDM was instead implemented as a full emulator in these versions of NT, using code licensed from Insignia's SoftPC. Up to Windows NT 3.51, only 80286 emulation was available. With Windows NT 4.0, 486 emulation was added.

NTVDM is not included with 64-bit versions of Windows or ARM32 based versions such as Windows RT or Windows 10 IoT Core. Windows 10 is the final version of Windows to include this component. 

This component has since been discontinued, as Windows 11 dropped support for 32-bit processors.

Commands
The following list of commands is part of the Windows XP MS-DOS subsystem.

 APPEND
 DEBUG
 EDIT
 EDLIN
 EXE2BIN
 FASTOPEN
 FORCEDOS
 GRAPHICS
 LOADFIX
 LOADHIGH (LH)
 MEM
 NLSFUNC
 SETVER
 SHARE

Security issue
In January 2010, Google security researcher Tavis Ormandy revealed a serious security flaw in Windows NT's VDM implementation that allowed unprivileged users to escalate their privileges to SYSTEM level, noted as applicable to the security of all x86 versions of the Windows NT kernel since 1993. This included all 32-bit versions of Windows NT, 2000, XP, Server 2003, Vista, Server 2008, and Windows 7. Ormandy published a proof-of-concept exploit for the vulnerability. Prior to Microsoft's release of a security patch, the workaround for this issue was to turn off 16-bit application support, which prevented older programs (those written for DOS and Windows 3.1) from running. 64-bit versions of Windows are not affected since the NTVDM subsystem is not included. Once the Microsoft security patches had been applied to the affected operating systems the VDM could be safely reenabled.

Limitations
A limitation exists in the Windows XP 16-bit subsystem (but not in earlier versions of Windows NT) because of the raised per-session limit for GDI objects which causes GDI handles to be shifted to the right by two bits, when converting them from 32 to 16 bits. As a result, the actual handle cannot be larger than 14 bits and consequently 16-bit applications that happen to be served a handle larger than 16384 by the GDI system crash and terminate with an error message.

In general, VDM and similar technologies do not satisfactorily run most older DOS games on today's computers. Emulation is only provided for the most basic peripherals, often implemented incompletely. For example, sound emulation in NTVDM is very limited. NT-family versions of Windows only update the real screen a few times per second when a DOS program writes to it, and they do not emulate higher resolution graphics modes. Because software mostly runs native at the speed of the host CPU, all timing loops will expire prematurely. This either makes a game run much too fast or causes the software not even to notice the emulated hardware peripherals, because it does not wait long enough for an answer.

Absence in x64 and AArch64 
In an x86-64 CPU, virtual 8086 mode is available as a sub-mode only in its legacy mode (for running 16- and 32-bit operating systems), not in the native 64-bit long mode. NTVDM is not supported on x86-64 editions of Windows, including DOS programs, because NTVDM uses VM86 CPU mode instead of the Local Descriptor Table in order to enable 16‑bits segment required for addressing. NTVDM is also unavailable on AArch64, because Microsoft did not release a full emulator for this incompatible instruction set like it did on previous incompatible architectures.

Whilst NTVDM is not supported on x86-64 versions of Windows, they can still be run using virtualization software, such as Windows XP Mode in non-home versions of Windows 7 or VMware Workstation. Other methods include using NTVDMx64, an unofficial port of the leaked emulated implementation of NTVDM from Windows NT 4.0 for non-x86 platforms, or OTVDM (WineVDM), a 16-bit Windows interpreter based on MAME's i386 emulation and the 16-bit portion of the popular Windows compatibility layer, Wine.

See also
 Comparison of platform virtualization software
 DESQview 386 (since 1988)
 Wine (software)
 DOSBox
 DOSEMU
 Merge (software)
 List of Microsoft Windows components
 Hypervisor
 Windows on Windows (WoW)
 Virtual machine (VM)

Notes

References

Further reading

External links
 Virtual DOS Machine Structure
 Troubleshooting MS-DOS-based programs in Windows XP
 Troubleshooting an MS-DOS application which hangs the NTVDM subsystem in Windows XP and Windows Server 2003
 Troubleshooting MS-DOS-based serial communication programs in Windows 2000 and later
 MS-DOS Player for Win32-x64, a Microsoft MS-DOS Emulator, runs many command line DOS programs like compilers or other tools, also packaged into one stand-alone executable file.
 vDOS, a DOS emulator designed for the running the more "serious" DOS apps (not games) on 64-bit NT systems (effectively a replacement for NTVDM on modern systems).

Virtualization
DOS technology
Windows administration
DOS emulators
Discontinued Windows components